Lisa Bunschoten (born 23 November 1995) is a Dutch para-snowboarder. She won a silver and a bronze medal in snowboarding at the 2018 Winter Paralympics.

Life and career 

Bunschoten was born with fibula aplasia. She competed at the 2014 Paralympics in Sochi, Russia, and won the 2015/16 overall World Cup title in banked slalom. Para-snowboarder Bibian Mentel coached Bunschoten early in her career.

She won the gold medal in the women's dual banked slalom SB-LL2 event at the 2021 World Para Snow Sports Championships held in Lillehammer, Norway. She also won the gold medal in the women's snowboard cross SB-LL2 event. Bunschoten and Renske van Beek also won the silver medal in the women's team event.

Bunschoten and Chris Vos were the flagbearers for the Netherlands during the opening ceremony of the 2022 Winter Paralympics in Beijing, China. Bunschoten missed out on winning a medal in the women's snowboard cross SB-LL2 event after a collision with eventual bronze medalist Brenna Huckaby of the United States. She also competed in the women's banked slalom SB-LL2 event.

Personal life 

She is in a relationship with snowboarder Chris Vos.

References

External links 
 
 Lisa Bunschoten at World Para Snowboard
 

1995 births
Living people
Dutch female snowboarders
Paralympic snowboarders of the Netherlands
Paralympic medalists in snowboarding
Paralympic silver medalists for the Netherlands
Paralympic bronze medalists for the Netherlands
Snowboarders at the 2014 Winter Paralympics
Snowboarders at the 2018 Winter Paralympics
Snowboarders at the 2022 Winter Paralympics
Medalists at the 2018 Winter Paralympics
Sportspeople from Utrecht (city)
21st-century Dutch women